Wall of honor may refer to:

 Donor recognition wall, where financial donations are honored.
 A type of memorial.
 National LGBTQ Wall of Honor, in New York City, New York.
 Milwaukee Brewers Wall of Honor, at Miller Park in Milwaukee, Wisconsin.